Poecilcoris druraei is a species of jewel bug described by Carl Linnaeus in 1771. It is in the family Scutelleridae  and is native to Hong Kong, Taiwan, and Thailand.

Taxonomy
Poecilcoris druraei has no subspecies, hower it does have one junior synonym, P. watanabei (Matsumura,1913) due to a misidentification.

Poecilcoris watanabei
The male "holotype" of P. watanabei is discovered sometime after the first description of it by Shonen Matsumura in 1913. Upon it, this holotype is almost the same to P. druraei, although the description of P. watanabei matches.

Ecology 
Poecilcoris druraei thrives on Morus alba, Camellia oleifera, and Camellia sinensis.

References

Scutelleridae
Taxa named by Carl Linnaeus
Insects described in 1771
Fauna of Hong Kong